Hugo Alejandro Sotil Yerén (born 18 May 1949) is a Peruvian former professional football player. Nicknamed El Cholo, he played as a striker or midfielder. Together with Teófilo Cubillas and Héctor Chumpitaz, he was one of Peru's most recognized football players of the 1970s. He also was a popular player in Peru, and a biopic on his life was released in that decade.
 He was a member of the Peruvian team that won the 1975 Copa América and reached the quarterfinals in Mexico 1970 and Argentina 1978.

"Cholo" Sotil was a skilled forward, with great dribbling. He also played as attacking midfielder and was a great assistant of football, due to the large number of goal passes he offered to his teammates. He made his professional debut in 1967, standing out with Deportivo Municipal and became one of the most popular players in Peru. In 1973 he gained international fame by signing for FC Barcelona forming a historic attacking duo with the Dutch star Johan Cruyff winning the Spanish League in his first season after 14 years of drought for the Catalan club. He became the first Latin American player to wear the "10" for FC Barcelona. Carrying the number 10 on his back in addition to getting 2 league runners-up and one in the Copa del Rey after 4 seasons with the Barça shirt. In 1977 he returned to Peru and became two-time national champion with Alianza Lima in 1977 and 1978.

In 1973 he joined the starting team of the America National Team that faced the Europe team of Cruyff, Eusébio and Facchetti The match ended 4 to 4, and Sotil scored the third goal for his team, then in a penalty shootout the American team won 7 to 6. That night he played alongside other South American figures such as Rivelino, Morena, Brindisi, Asparagus, Cubillas and others.

He was international with the Peruvian team, with which he played two editions of the Soccer World Cup: those of 1970 and 1978, where he reached the quarterfinals in both World Cups. On a continental level, he won the Copa América in 1975—, where he scored the only goal of the final match against Colombia, giving the Inca team the title of Champions of America.

Hugo Sotil has been one of the most popular athletes in his country, to the point that in 1972, he starred in a film directed by Bernardo Batievsky (his great admirer) entitled Cholo.

Club career

CD Municipal
In 1968, Sotil made his debut at the professional level for Municipal in the Peruvian Second Division, which he helped to obtain promotion to the First Division that year.

Sotil also played and scored the opening goal in an all-star match between Europe and South America in 1973 at the Camp Nou in Barcelona. Soccer greats such as Johan Cruyff, Franz Beckenbauer, Roberto Rivelino and Teófilo Cubillas took part in that game. The game finished 4–4 and in Penalty kicks, South America won 7–6.

FC Barcelona
In 1973, he was transferred to FC Barcelona of Spain, where he was teammate of the stars Johan Cruyff, Juan Manuel Asensi and Carles Rexach, among others. He was the club's striker, holding the number ten shirt. He made his debut for Barça on 22 August, winning the Joan Gamper Trophy after beating Borussia Mönchengladbach 4–2 in penalties (2–2 in normal time), with Sotil scoring the opening goal.

In the 1973–1974 season, Barcelona won the Spanish League after 14 trophyless seasons. Sotil was part of the team which demolished Real Madrid 5–0 in the Spanish League game played at the Santiago Bernabéu Stadium, where he scored the fifth goal. On 21 Aug 1974 Sotil won his second Gamper Trophy after a 4–1 victory against Rangers F.C. By then, he was one of the Spanish League's most recognized football players.

Barcelona's hiring of Dutchman Johan Neeskens, who took a foreigner slot, resulted in his relegation from the first team in the 1974–1975 season. FC Barcelona occupied third place, and Catalan people demanded the return of Sotil to the team first for 1975–1976 season.

He stayed with FC Barcelona for three seasons (1973 to 1976), played 111 games, and scored 33 goals.

Alianza Lima
In 1977, he returned to Peru and played for Alianza Lima, Sotil had a brief resurgence in form that lasted for two seasons, showing that, although he had lost some of his pace, he retained his skills. He helped the team to win the 1977 and 1978 titles leaving a trail of 23 goals in 48 matches and a good 1978 Copa Libertadores.

Independiente Medellín
In 1979, Sotil went to Colombia, where he did not perform well. Constantly in and out of the lineup and only able to score 8 goals in 33 matches Sotil considered retiring from football.

CD Municipal
But Sotil decided he would make one final push going back to Municipal and playing there until 1982, and returning briefly to football in 1984, playing for Espartanos, a small provincial team. He currently works in Peru training youngsters.

International career

Summary
Sotil made his debut for the Peru national football team on 4 February 1970, in a friendly game against Bulgaria at Lima, he scored a hat-trick for Peru in a 5–3 win. He made a total of 62 appearances for Peru between 1970 and 1978, scoring 18 goals,.

1970 FIFA World Cup: Quarter Finals
He was part of the Peru national football team in the 1970 World Cup in Mexico and although he was used most often as a substitute in the tournament, he was still able to play in a 3–2 win against Bulgaria, a 3–0 win against Morocco and a 1–3 loss to West Germany. He was also in the quarterfinal loss against eventual champions Brazil by 2–4. Sotil is also much remembered for his assists, as he helped teammate Teófilo Cubillas to capture the Bronze Boot.

Copa America 1975: Champion
Sotil won the 1975 Copa América, playing only in the final game since his club did not allow him to travel often. Sotil arrived in Caracas, where the final was played, and he went immediately from the airport to the soccer stadium arriving when all his teammates were warming up. In that game, against Colombia, Sotil scored the only goal, giving Peru its second title as South American champions.

1978 FIFA World Cup: Second Round
Peru finished first in the South American qualifying subgroup for the 1978 FIFA World Cup qualification after draws with Ecuador, 1–1, and Chile, 1–1, in the first leg and wins by 4–0 against Ecuador a victory against Chile 2–0 in the second leg, with Sotil scoring one and assisting the other to Juan Carlos Oblitas.

At the 1978 FIFA World Cup Sotil appeared in two out of three group stage matches. His first start of the competition was a 3–1 win over Scotland, on 3 June. After a draw with the Netherlands, 0–0, and a win over Iran 4–1, Peru pushed the Netherlands into second place in Group 4. Expectations were high for Peru, however, with 3 losses, Peru finished at the bottom of their group went out in the second round. Sotil failed to score in the tournament.

He became famous for his great passing qualities and excellent dribbling, but allegedly various personal problems curtailed his playing career.

Career statistics

Honors

Club

FC Barcelona
Spanish League
Winner (1): 1973–74
Runner-up (1): 1975–76
Joan Gamper Trophy
Winner (4): 1973, 1974, 1975, 1976
Copa del Rey
Runner-up (1): 1973–74

Alianza Lima
Peruvian League
Winner (2): 1977, 1978
Metropolitan Championship
Winner (1): 1978

CD Municipal
Peruvian Segunda División: 1
Winner (1): 1968
Peruvian League
Runner-up (1): 1981

Los Espartanos de Pacasmayo
Copa Perú: 1
Winner (1): 1984

Peru national team
Copa America
Winner (1):1975

Individual awards
1968 Peruvian Segunda División Top goalscorer (14 goals)
1973 Peruvian Footballer of the Year
1973 CONMEBOL XI All-Star Team
1974 Peruvian Footballer of the Year
2006 Named one of the Great Stars of the World Cup History

References

External links
Some of the Maximum Figures of World Soccer www.terra.com
The 4 greats of Barcelona www.terra.com
Hugo "Cholo" Sotil, a great one for all time www.conmmebol.com
History of world soccer
Hugo Sotil, Biography www.arkivperu

 Profile– www.weltfussball.de 

1949 births
Living people
People from Ica, Peru
Peruvian footballers
Peru international footballers
1970 FIFA World Cup players
1975 Copa América players
1978 FIFA World Cup players
Association football midfielders
Peruvian Primera División players
La Liga players
Categoría Primera A players
FC Barcelona players
Club Alianza Lima footballers
Independiente Medellín footballers
Deportivo Municipal footballers
Peruvian expatriate footballers
Peruvian expatriate sportspeople in Spain
Expatriate footballers in Spain
Expatriate footballers in Colombia
Copa América-winning players
Deportivo Municipal managers